Christian D'Urso (born 26 July 1997) is an Italian professional football midfielder who plays for  club Cosenza.

Club career

Early career
D'Urso was born in Rieti, Italy. He began his professional career in the youth teams of local Lazio club and Serie A giants A.S. Roma. After playing in the youth teams, D'Urso became a mainstay in the Primavera side and went on to make over fifty appearances under manager Alberto de Rossi, in the Campionato Nazionale Primavera and UEFA Youth League.

2016–17 season
After impressing, D'Urso was loaned out to Serie B side Latina in order to gain match experience in professional leagues. He made his debut for Latina on 27 August 2016 in an eventual 1–4 loss to Hellas Verona, playing just over half an hour after coming on as a substitute.

Loan to Apollon Smyrnis
On 30 August 2018, he joined Apollon Smyrnis of the Superleague on a season-long loan from Roma.

Cittadella
On 7 August 2019, D'Urso signed to Serie B side Cittadella a deal.

Perugia
On 31 January 2022, D'Urso moved to Perugia on loan with an obligation to buy.

Cosenza
On 1 July 2022, D'Urso signed with Cosenza.

References

External links
 

Living people
1997 births
People from Rieti
Footballers from Lazio
Association football midfielders
Italian footballers
Italy youth international footballers
A.S. Roma players
Latina Calcio 1932 players
A.C. Carpi players
Ascoli Calcio 1898 F.C. players
A.S. Cittadella players
A.C. Perugia Calcio players
Cosenza Calcio players
Serie B players
Sportspeople from the Province of Rieti